Qaleh Rigi (also Romanized as Qal‘eh Rīgī) is a village in Sarduiyeh Rural District, Sarduiyeh District, Jiroft County, Kerman Province, Iran. At the 2006 census, its population was 173, in 32 families.

References 

Populated places in Jiroft County